Tsingue is a village in south-eastern Gabon. It is located in the Mouloundou Department in Ogooué-Lolo Province.

Nearby towns and villages include Mahouna (3.0 nm), Lingoye (1.4 nm), Missala (1.4 nm), Djondi (1.4 nm), Masoukou (1.0 nm) and Mikouma (2.2 nm).

Populated places in Ogooué-Lolo Province
Mouloundou Department